Mexican singer Anahí has released 6 studio albums, 3 compilation albums, 1 extended play (EP), 28 singles (including 2 as a featured artist), 10 promotional singles and 22 music videos. Before RBD, Anahí released 4 albums. The success of them was more limited, none of them officially charted. She has sold three million albums as a solo artist.

In 2009, she released the album Mi Delirio. The album had a moderate success, selling one million copies worldwide. The first single of the album charted on the US Latin Pop chart. The album was certified gold in Brazil for over 20,000 copies sold.

Albums

Studio albums

Compilation albums

EPs

Singles

As main artist

Featured singles

Promotional singles

Other appearances

Music videos

References

External links
 Official Website

Discography
Latin pop music discographies
Discographies of Mexican artists